Meze or mezé is a selection of small dishes served as appetizers in the Levant, Turkey, Greece, Iraq, the Balkans, the Caucasus and Iran. It is similar to Spanish tapas and Italian antipasti. A mezze may be served as a part of a multi-course meal or form a meal in itself. Mezze are often served with alcoholic beverages such as arak.

Etymology

The word meze is found in all the cuisines of the former Ottoman Empire, borrowed from Turkish, which in turn had borrowed it from the Persian "mazzeh" or "mazzah" 'taste' or 'relish'.

Common dishes

In Turkey, meze often consist of beyaz peynir (literally "white cheese"), kavun (sliced ripe melon), acılı ezme (hot pepper paste often with walnuts), haydari (thick strained yogurt with herbs), patlıcan salatası (cold eggplant salad), beyin salatası (brain salad), kalamar tava (fried calamari or squid), midye dolma and midye tava (stuffed or fried mussels), enginar (artichokes), cacık (yogurt with cucumber and garlic), pilaki (foods cooked in a special sauce), dolma or sarma (rice-stuffed vine leaves or other stuffed vegetables, such as bell peppers), Arnavut ciğeri (a liver dish, served cold), octopus salad, and çiğ köfte (raw meatballs with bulgur).

In Greece, Cyprus, Bulgaria and the rest of the Balkans, mezé, mezés, or mezédhes (plural) are small dishes, hot or cold, spicy or savory. Seafood dishes such as grilled octopus may be included, along with salads, sliced hard-boiled eggs, garlic bread, kalamata olives, fava beans, fried vegetables, melitzanosalata (eggplant salad), taramosalata, fried or grilled cheeses called saganaki, and sheep, goat, or cow cheeses. 

Popular meze dishes include the following.

Other meze dishes include cheeses (like halloumi, labneh, tulum or shanklish) or meat dishes (like afelia, lountza, or pastirma), fish (like fried whitebait, calamari).

In Palestine, Jordan, Syria, Lebanon and Cyprus, meze is often a meal in its own right. There are vegetarian, meat or fish mezes. Groups of dishes arrive at the table about four or five at a time (usually between five and ten groups). There is a set pattern to the dishes: typically olives, tahini, salad and yogurt will be followed by dishes with vegetables and eggs, then small meat or fish dishes alongside special accompaniments, and finally more substantial dishes such as whole fish or meat stews and grills. Establishments will offer their own specialties, but the pattern remains the same.  Naturally the dishes served will reflect the seasons. For example, in late autumn, snails will be prominent. As so much food is offered, it is not expected that every dish be finished, but rather shared at will and served at ease.

In the Balkans, meze is very similar to an Italian antipasto in that cured cold-cuts, cheese and salads are dominant and cooked foods are not included. In Serbia, Croatia, Bosnia and Montenegro it includes hard or creamy cheeses, kajmak (clotted cream) or smetana cream, salami, ham and other forms of "suho/suvo meso" (cured pork or beef), kulen (paprika flavoured, cured sausage), cured bacon, ajvar, and various savory pastries. For Muslims, meze replaces pork products with sudžuk (dry, spicy sausage) and the pastirma-like cured beef suho meso. In southern Croatia, Herzegovina, and Montenegro, cured meat such as pršut and panceta and regional products like olives are common. Albanian-style meze platters typically include prosciutto ham, salami and brined cheese, accompanied with roasted bell peppers (capsicum) or green olives marinated in olive oil with garlic. In Bulgaria, popular mezes are lukanka (a spicy sausage), soujouk (a dry and spicy sausage) and sirene (a white brine cheese). The Bulgarian-made Shopska salad is also a very popular meze. It is made with tomatoes, cucumbers, onion, peppers and sirene. Ajvar and pindjur are popular mezes in North Macedonia. In Romania, mezelic means a quick appetizer and includes zacuscă, cheeses and salamis, often accompanied by tuică.

Alcoholic accompaniment
Depending on the region, meze can be served with alcohol. In the Middle East, most people will opt for Arak or Ouzo. In the Balkans, meze are generally accompanied by the distilled drinks rakı, arak, ouzo, Aragh Sagi, rakia, mastika, or tsipouro. It may also be consumed with beer, wine and other alcoholic drinks. Cyprus brandy (served neat) is a favourite drink to accompany meze in Cyprus, although lager or wine are popular with some.

Serving traditions
In Bulgaria, meze is served primarily at the consumption of wine, rakia and mastika, but also accompanying other alcoholic drinks that are not local to the region. In addition to traditional local foods, meze can include nuts, sweets or pre-packaged snacks. The term meze is generally applied to any foods and snacks consumed alongside an alcoholic beverage.
In Greece, meze is served in restaurants called mezedopoleíon and tsipourádiko or ouzerí, a type of café that serves ouzo or tsipouro. A tavérna (tavern) or estiatório (restaurant) offer a mezé as an orektikó (appetiser). Many restaurants offer their house poikilía ("variety")—a platter with a smorgasbord of mezédhes that can be served immediately to customers looking for a quick or light meal. Hosts commonly serve mezédhes to their guests at informal or impromptu get-togethers, as they are easy to prepare on short notice. Krasomezédhes (literally "wine-meze") is a meze that goes well with wine; ouzomezédhes are meze that goes with ouzo.

See also

 Aahaan kap klaem

 Anju
 Antipasti
 Banchan
 Dim sum
 List of hors d'oeuvre
 Smörgåsbord
 Tapas
 Thali
 Zakuski

References

Bibliography

External links

 
Appetizers
Balkan cuisine
Middle Eastern cuisine
Serving and dining
Snack foods
Lebanese snack foods